William Morgan may refer to:

Arts and entertainment
 William De Morgan (1839–1917), pottery and tile designer in Britain
 William Morgan (director) (1899–1964), English film director and editor
 William Michael Morgan (born 1993), American country music singer
 William Evan Charles Morgan, artist, etcher and engraver

Military
 William H. Morgan (1831–?), American general
 William Duthie Morgan (1891–1977), general in the British Army after whom the Morgan Line was named
 William J. Morgan (historian) (1917–2003), Senior Historian at the U.S. Naval Historical Center and editor of Naval Documents of the American Revolution
 William Alexander Morgan (1928–1961), American who fought in the Cuban Revolution
 William B. Morgan, American naval architect
 William D. Morgan (1947–1969), Medal of Honor recipient, U.S. Marine killed in action in Vietnam

Politics

United Kingdom
 William Morgan (died 1602), MP for Haslemere
 William Morgan (died 1569), MP for Monmouthshire
 William Morgan (died 1582), MP for Monmouthshire
 William Morgan (died 1583) (1542–1583), MP for Monmouth Boroughs
 William Morgan (of Tredegar) (1560–1653), Welsh politician
 William Morgan (of Rhymny), Welsh politician
 William Morgan (of Dderw) (died 1649), Welsh lawyer and politician
 William Morgan (of Machen and Tredegar) (c. 1640–1680), Member of Parliament for Monmouthshire 1659–1680
 Sir William Morgan (of Tredegar, elder) (1700–1731), Member of Parliament for Brecon, 1722–1723, and Monmouthshire, 1722–1731
 William Morgan (of Tredegar, younger) (1725–1763), Member of Parliament for Monmouthshire, 1747–1763
 William Pritchard Morgan (1844–1924), British Member of Parliament for Merthyr Tydfil, 1888–1900
 William James Morgan (1914–1999), Irish politician

United States
 William S. Morgan (1801–1878), U.S. Representative from Virginia
 William Duane Morgan (1817–1887), American newspaper editor and politician
 William Augustine Morgan (1831-1899), Virginia planter, Confederate cavalry officer, early West Virginia politician
 William Albert Morgan (1841–1917), Irish-American newspaper publisher and politician
 William Yoast Morgan (1866–1932), lieutenant governor of Kansas
 William McKendree Morgan (1869–1942), Idaho lawyer and politician
 William M. Morgan (congressman) (1870–1935), U.S. Representative from Ohio
 Will Morgan (born 1966), member of the Minnesota House of Representatives

Other politicians
 William Morgan (South Australian politician) (1828–1883), Premier of South Australia, 1878–1881
 William Morgan (New South Wales politician) (1842–1907), member of the New South Wales Legislative Assembly, 1894–1901
 William Morgan (Canadian politician) (1848–after 1890), politician in Ontario, Canada
 William Morgan (New Zealand politician) (1851–1918), member of the New Zealand Legislative Council

Science and medicine
 William Morgan (cartographer) (died 1690), English cartographer
 William Morgan (actuary) (1750–1833), Welsh scientist and actuary who won the Copley Medal in 1789
 William Fellowes Morgan Sr. (1861–1943), president of the National Association for the Prevention of Blindness
 William Wilson Morgan (1906–1994), American astronomer
 W. Jason Morgan (born 1935), American geophysicist
 G. William Morgan (died 1984), American health physicist

Sports
 William Morgan (cricketer, born 1862) (1862–1914), Welsh cricketer
 William Morgan (cricketer, born 1864) (1864–1934), English cricketer
 William G. Morgan (1870–1942), American inventor of the game of volleyball
 William Llewellyn Morgan (1884–1960), Welsh international rugby union player
 William A. Morgan (footballer) (born 1914), English footballer who played as goalkeeper for Coventry City F.C.
 William Morgan (rugby league), rugby league footballer of the 1930s for Wales, and Wigan
 Sack Morgan (William Lee Morgan), American baseball player
 William James Morgan aka Jimmy Morgan (1922–1975), English footballer and Royal Marines Commando
 Willie Morgan (born 1944), Scottish footballer
 William Morgan (judoka) (born 1975), Canadian Paralympic judo competitor

Others
 William Morgan (Bible translator) (1545–1604), Welsh translator of the Bible
 William Morgan (anti-Mason) (1774–1826?), New York businessman whose book on Freemasonry and subsequent disappearance sparked the U.S. anti-Masonic movement
 William Morgan (1782–1858), Welsh evangelical cleric in Bradford
 William Morgan (abolitionist) (1815–c. 1890), town clerk in Birmingham, England
 William J. Morgan (New York politician) (1840–1900), NYS comptroller, 1899–1900
 W. E. Morgan (William Evan Morgan, 1858–1916), Welsh trade union leader
 William J. Morgan (Wisconsin politician) (1883–1983), Wisconsin Attorney General
 William Fellowes Morgan Jr. (1889–1977), president of the Middle Atlantic Oyster Fisheries, and later Commissioner of Public Markets for New York City
 William Morgan (architect) (1930–2016), American architect and author

See also
 William Morgan Butler (1861–1937), U.S. political figure in the 1920s
 Bill Morgan (disambiguation)
 Billy Morgan (disambiguation)
 Morgan (surname)